Newtown Creek is a tributary, rising near Stoop Road in Newtown Township, Bucks County, Pennsylvania, United States. It is part of the Delaware River watershed and is located entirely in Bucks County, Pennsylvania. The Newtown Creek Bridge over Centre Avenue was added to the National Register of Historic Places in 1988.

Statistics
Newtown Creek rises near Stoopville Road east of Pennsylvania Route 413, flows generally in a southerly direction to its confluence at the Neshaminy Creek's 16.1 river mile passing along the western side of Newtown Borough.

Tributaries
Newtown Creek has one unnamed tributary on the left bank near Wright's Road.

Geology
Appalachian Highlands Division
Piedmont Province
Gettysburg-Newark Lowland Section
Lockatong Formation
Newtown Creek rises in the Lockatong Formation, sedimentary rock deposited during the Upper Triassic. Mineralogy includes argillite, shale, some limestone and calcareous shale.

Municipalities
Middletown Township
Newtown Township
Newtown Borough

Crossings and Bridges

See also
List of rivers of Pennsylvania
List of rivers of the United States
List of Delaware River tributaries

References

Rivers of Pennsylvania
Rivers of Bucks County, Pennsylvania
Tributaries of the Neshaminy Creek